Michael Shinagel is the former dean of the Division of Continuing Education and University Extension at Harvard University, and the longest serving dean in Harvard's history.

Early life
He was a child in Vienna, Austria, and his family had to escape Europe after the rise of Adolf Hitler and the start of World War II.  As a refugee, he attended school in New York City and briefly attended Cornell University in 1951 and 1952, studying agriculture.  He served with the US Army in Korea, and then completed his degree at Oberlin College on the G.I. Bill. He earned his doctorate in English Literature at Harvard University on a national fellowship.

Career
After completing his doctorate in 1964, he began an academic career of teaching and administration at Cornell University  from 1964 to 1967.  He then moved on to Union College from 1967 to 1975. At Union he served two three-year terms of chairman of the English Dept. and in 1972 was promoted to professor of English.

Shinagel was the fifth dean of the Extension School, having been appointed in 1977 and serving until 2013.  Prior to being named dean, he was the Director of Continuing Education and University Extension from 1975 to 1977.  He was also formerly Master of Quincy House.

Books
He is the author of a history of the Harvard Extension School, The Gates Unbarred, and a memoir, Holocaust Survivor to Harvard Dean: Memoirs of a Refugee's Progress.

References

Works cited

Living people
Harvard Extension School faculty
Harvard University administrators
Harvard University alumni
Oberlin College alumni
United States Army personnel of the Korean War
Austrian refugees
1934 births
Cornell University College of Agriculture and Life Sciences alumni